Trescore Balneario is a town and comune in the Province of Bergamo, Lombardy, northern Italy.

Twin towns
 Zuera,  Spain
 Čelákovice,  Czech Republic

References